The 1975 Giro d'Italia was the 58th edition of the Giro d'Italia, one of cycling's Grand Tours. The field consisted of 90 riders, and 70 riders finished the race.

By rider

By nationality

References

1975 Giro d'Italia
1975